is Ken Hirai's thirty-second single, released on October 21, 2009, just a month after "Candy". The single was released in two formats: limited CD+DVD and regular CD only editions. The title song was written for the movie , starring Mao Inoue and Masaki Okada.

In 2011, the song was certified as being downloaded more than 500,000 times as a full-length download to cellphones.

Track list

Charts

Oricon sales chart

Billboard Japan sales chart

Physical sales charts

References

External links
Ken Hirai Official Web Site

2009 singles
Ken Hirai songs
Billboard Japan Hot 100 number-one singles
RIAJ Digital Track Chart number-one singles
Songs written by Ken Hirai
Song recordings produced by Seiji Kameda
Defstar Records singles
2009 songs
Japanese film songs